Pomacea pealiana is a South American species of freshwater snail with gills and an operculum, an aquatic gastropod mollusc in the family Ampullariidae, the apple snails.

Distribution
P. pealiana is endemic to Colombia, Ecuador, Venezuela, Panama  and Brazil.

References

pealiana
Molluscs of South America
Gastropods described in 1838